Ifá is a Yoruba religion and system of divination. Its  literary corpus is the Odu Ifá. Orunmila is identified as the Grand Priest, as he revealed divinity and prophecy to the world. Babalawos or Iyanifas use either the divining chain known as Opele, or the sacred palm or kola nuts called Ikin, on the wooden divination tray called Opon Ifá.

Ifá is practiced throughout the Americas, West Africa, and the Canary Islands, in the form of a complex religious system, and plays a critical role in the traditions of Santería, Candomblé, Palo, Umbanda, Vodou, and other Afro-American faiths, as well as in some traditional African religions.

History
The 16-principle system has its earliest history in West Africa. Each Niger–Congo-speaking ethnic group that practices it has its own myths of origin; Yoruba religion suggests that it was founded by Orunmila in Ilé-Ifẹ̀ when he initiated himself and then he initiated his students, Akoda and Aseda. Other myths suggest that it was brought to Ilé-Ifẹ̀ by Setiu, a Nupe man who settled in Ilé-Ifẹ̀. According to the book The History of the Yorubas from the Earliest of Times to the British Protectorate (1921) by Nigerian historian Samuel Johnson and Obadiah Johnson, it was Arugba, the mother of Onibogi, the 8th Alaafin of Oyo who introduced Oyo to Ifá in the late 1400s. She initiated the Alado of Ato and conferred on him the rites to initiate others. The Alado, in turn, initiated the priests of Oyo and that was how Ifá came to be in the Oyo empire.

Orunmila came to establish an oral literary corpus incorporating stories and experiences of priests and their clients along with the results. This odu corpus emerges as the leading documentation on the Ifá tradition to become a historical legacy.

Yoruba canon
In Yorubaland, divination gives priests unreserved access to the teachings of Orunmila. Eshu is the one said to lend ashe to the oracle during provision of direction and or clarification of counsel. Eshu is also the one that holds the keys to one's ire (fortune or blessing) and thus acts as Oluwinni (one's Creditor): he can grant ire or remove it. Ifá divination rites provide an avenue of communication to the spiritual realm and the intent of one's destiny.

In Igboland, Ifá is known as Afá, and is performed by specialists called Dibia. The Dibia is considered a doctor and specializes in the use of herbs for healing and transformation.

Ewe canon
Among the Ewe people of southern Togo and southeast Ghana, Ifá is also known as Afá, where the Vodun spirits come through and speak. In many of their Egbes, it is Alaundje who is honored as the first Bokono to have been taught how to divine the destiny of humans using the holy system of Afá.
The Amengansi are the living oracles who are higher than a bokono. A priest who is not a bokono is known as Hounan, similar to Houngan, a male priest in Haitian Vodou, a derivative religion of Vodun, the religion of the Ewe.

Odù Ifá

There are sixteen major books in the Odu Ifá literary corpus. When combined, there are a total of 256 Odu (a collection of sixteen, each of which has sixteen alternatives ⇔ 162, or 44) that are believed to reference all situations, circumstances, actions and consequences in life based on the uncountable ese (or "poetic tutorials") relative to the 256 Odu coding. These form the basis of traditional Yoruba spiritual knowledge and are the foundation of all Yoruba divination systems. Ifá proverbs, stories, and poetry are not written down. Rather, they are passed down orally from one babalawo to another. Yoruba people consult Ifá for divine intervention and spiritual guidance.

The Messenger sign of Ifá
In addition to the sixteen fundamental signs, Ifá divination includes a major sign, which is the combination of Ọse and Otura, from right to left (Ọse-Tura). 

That sign must be written each time a ritual is performed: Ọse-Tura is the messenger and the carrier of the sacrifice. It is closely associated with the god Eshu in the system of Ifá. That Messenger sign was known in Arab and Latin medieval geomancy as the Morning Star, that is as the planet Venus. In other words, Ọse-Tura is a remainder of ancient astrology in Ifá divination.

International recognition
The Ifá divination system was added in 2005 by UNESCO to its list of the "Masterpieces of the Oral and Intangible Heritage of Humanity".

Ifá in Santería

Ifá is used in the Afro-Cuban religion of Santería; it is the most complex and prestigious divinatory system used in the religion. The two are closely linked, sharing the same mythology and conception of the universe, although Ifá also has a separate existence from Santería. High priests of Ifá are known as babalawos and although their presence is not essential to Santería ceremonies, they often attend in their capacity as diviners. Many santeros are also babalawos, although it is not uncommon for babalawos to perceive themselves as being superior to most santeros. Traditionally, only heterosexual men are allowed to become babalawos, although homosexual male babalawos now exist due to the more open policy for Santería initiates.  Women are typically prohibited from taking on this role, a restriction explained through the story that the òrìṣà (pronounced "orisha" or "oricha" in Spanish) Orula
was furious that Yemayá, his wife, had used his tabla divining board and subsequently decided to ban women from ever touching it again. In spite of this legend, by the early 21st century, a small number of women have since 
been initiated as babalawos. Initiation as a babalawo requires a payment to the initiator and is typically regarded as highly expensive.

The òrìṣà of Ifá, Orula or Ọ̀rúnmila, also has a prominent place within Santería. He is believed to oversee divination; once an individual is initiated as a babalawo they are given a pot containing various items, including palm nuts, which is believed to be the literal embodiment of Orula. Babalawos provide offerings to Orula, including animal sacrifices and gifts of money. In Cuba, Ifá typically involves the casting of consecrated palm nuts to answer a question. The babalawo then interprets the message of the nuts depending on how they have fallen; there are 256 possible configurations in the Ifá system, which the babalawo is expected to have memorised. Individuals approach the babalawo seeking guidance, often on financial matters, at which the diviner will consult Orula through the established divinatory method. In turn, those visiting the babalawos pay them for their services.

Notable followers
 Yoshiaki Koshikawa, Japanese professor of literature at Meiji University and first Japanese person to be initiated as a babalawo.
 Susanne Wenger, Austrian artist
 Patrisse Cullors, American co-founder of the Black Lives Matter movement
 Shéyaa Bin Abraham-Joseph (21 Savage), British-American rap artist. 
 Xolo Maridueña, American actor.
 Iyanla Vanzant, American author, Life & spiritual Coach, Iyanifa & Priestess of Obatala.

See also 
 African diaspora religions
 Babalawo
 Iyalawo
 Orunmila

References

Sources

Further reading
 Chief FAMA Fundamentals of the Yoruba Religion (Orisa Worship)  (works self-published through her company)
 Chief FAMA Practitioners' Handbook for the Ifa Professional 
 Chief FAMA Fundamentos de la Religion Yoruba (Adorando Orisa) 
 
 Chief FAMA FAMA'S EDE AWO (Orisa Yoruba Dictionary) 
 Chief FAMA The Rituals (novela) 
 Awo Fasina Falade Ifa: The Key to Its Understanding  
 Chief Adedoja Aluko  The Sixteen (16) Major Odu Ifa from Ile-Ife 
 Chief S. Solagbade Popoola library, INC Ifa Dida: Vol 1 (EjiOgbe - Orangun Meji), 
 Chief S. Solagbade Popoola library, INC Ifa Dida: Vol 2 (Ogbe Oyeku - Ogbe Ofun), 
 Chief S. Solagbade Popoola & Fakunle Oyesanya Ikunle Abiyamo - The ASE of Motherhood 
 C. Osamaro Ibie Ifism the Complete Works of Orunmila 
 William R. Bascom: Ifa Divination: Communication Between Gods and Men in West Africa 
 William R. Bascom: Sixteen Cowries: Yoruba Divination from Africa to the New World 
Rosenthal, J. ‘Possession Ecstasy & Law in Ewe Voodoo"  
Maupoil, Bernard.  "La Geomancie L'ancienne  Côte des Esclaves
 Alapini,  Julien.  Les noix sacrées. Etude complète de Fa-Ahidégoun génie de la sagesse et de la divination au Dahomey
 Dr. Ron Eglash (1997) American Anthropologist Recursion in ethnomathematics, Chaos Theory in West African divination.
 Bàbálàwó Ifatunwase Tratados Enciclopédicos de Ifá (Colección Alafundé), 

Traditional African religions
Afro-American religion
Yoruba culture
Yoruba deities
Divination
Masterpieces of the Oral and Intangible Heritage of Humanity
Santería